The 2011–12 Miami Hurricanes men's basketball team represented the University of Miami during the 2011–12 NCAA Division I men's basketball season. The Hurricanes, led by first year head coach Jim Larrañaga, played their home games at the BankUnited Center and were members of the Atlantic Coast Conference. They finished the season 20–13 overall, 9–7 in ACC play to finish in a three-way tie for fourth place. They defeated Georgia Tech in the first round of the ACC tournament before falling to Florida State in the quarterfinals. They were invited to the National Invitation Tournament where they defeated Valparaiso in the first round before falling to Minnesota in the second round.

Previous season
The Hurricanes finished the 2010–11 season 21–15 overall, 6–10 in ACC play and lost in the quarterfinals of the NIT to Alabama.

Departures

2011 recruiting class

Roster

}

Schedule

|-
!colspan=12 style=| Exhibition

|-
!colspan=12 style=| Non-conference Regular Season

|-
!colspan=12 style="background:#005030; color:white;"| ACC Regular Season

|-
!colspan=12 style=| ACC tournament

|-
!colspan=12 style=| National Invitation Tournament

References

Miami Hurricanes men's basketball seasons
Miami Hurricanes
Miami Hurricanes men's basketball team
Miami Hurricanes men's basketball team
Miami Hurricanes